Ust-Kamchatsk is a rural locality (a settlement) and the administrative center of Ust-Kamchatsky District of Kamchatka Krai, Russia, located on the eastern shore of the Kamchatka Peninsula at the mouth of the Kamchatka River some  away from the Klyuchevskaya Sopka volcano and  from Petropavlovsk-Kamchatsky. Population:

History 
It was founded in 1731 as the settlement of Ust-Primorsky and was renamed Ust-Kamchatsk in 1890. In 2007, Ust-Kamchatsk was demoted in status from urban-type settlement to a rural locality.

Economy 
There is a sea port, a fish-processing plant (FPP 66), a few woodworking factories, and Ust-Kamchatsk Airport (opened in 1937) in Ust-Kamchatsk.

Climate 
Ust-Kamchatsk has a subarctic climate (Köppen Dfc) although it has a strong maritime influence resulting in much less extreme winters, cooler summers and much heavier precipitation (both as winter snowfall and summer rainfall) compared to interior Siberia and even the Sea of Okhotsk coast. For instance, mean July maxima are  cooler than those of Yakutsk, whereas January means are around  warmer than the Sakha capital. The effect of the cold Oyashio Current in summer and frequent offshore winds from the Siberian High and Aleutian Low in winter means that, despite the substantial maritime moderation of winter temperatures, annual means are still  colder than Ketchikan at a similar latitude on the western coast of North America and  colder than Edinburgh at a similar latitude in northwestern Europe.

References 

Rural localities in Kamchatka Krai
Populated places established in 1731